Filippo Tamagnini (born 30 January 1972) is a Sammarinese politician who was a Captain Regent (head of government for San Marino) for the April to October 2011 political term. The post was shared with Maria Luisa Berti.

External links
April-October 2011 election information (in Italian)

1972 births
Captains Regent of San Marino
Members of the Grand and General Council
Living people
Sammarinese Christian Democratic Party politicians